Edimar Curitiba Fraga (born 21 May 1986), simply known as Edimar, is a Brazilian professional footballer who plays as a left-back for Vasco da Gama.

Club career
Born in Iconha, Espírito Santo, Edimar joined Cruzeiro's youth setup in 2003, aged 16, after starting it out at Cachoeiro. In 2006, he was loaned to Guarani, but only appeared in one match during the whole campaign.

In 2008, Edimar played 13 Campeonato Mineiro games for Tupi and scored one goal, before moving to Ipatinga. He appeared in five Série A matches for the latter.

On 1 July 2008 Edimar was loaned to Portuguese Primeira Liga club S.C. Braga, in a season-long deal. He made his debut in the competition on 15 March 2009, starting in a 1–1 home draw against Académica de Coimbra.

Edimar scored his first goal on 24 May, netting his side's only in a 1–1 away draw against FC Porto. He subsequently returned to Cruzeiro in June 2009, but moved to Romanian Liga I side CFR Cluj on 28 July; with the latter he featured regularly over the course of three campaigns, winning both league and cup in 2009–10.

On 3 August 2011 Edimar was loaned to Superleague Greece team Xanthi F.C., in a season-long deal. During his spell he suffered with weather, and with racism in a match against PAS Giannina F.C.

On 5 August 2012 Edimar joined Rio Ave F.C., also in a temporary deal. He featured regularly as a first choice, and returned to Cluj in June 2013; however, on 23 July he returned to his previous club, also on loan.

On 4 June 2014 Edimar joined Serie A club A.C. ChievoVerona, after agreeing to a three-year deal. On 7 January of the following year, after featuring in only nine minutes in the league, he was loaned to La Liga's Córdoba CF, until June.

Edimar made his debut in the main category of Spanish football on 12 January, starting in a 1–0 away win against Rayo Vallecano.

On the 24th, in a 1–2 home loss against Real Madrid, Edimar was kicked by Cristiano Ronaldo, which led to the ejection of the latter. He later stated that it was "all forgiven", after a formal excuse was made by Ronaldo in his Twitter.

Honours
CFR Cluj
Liga I: 2009–10
Cupa României: 2009–10
Supercupa României: 2010

References

External links
 
 
 
 
 

1986 births
Living people
Sportspeople from Espírito Santo
Brazilian footballers
Association football defenders
Cruzeiro Esporte Clube players
Guarani Esporte Clube (MG) players
Tupi Football Club players
Ipatinga Futebol Clube players
Primeira Liga players
S.C. Braga players
Rio Ave F.C. players
Liga I players
CFR Cluj players
Super League Greece players
Xanthi F.C. players
Serie A players
A.C. ChievoVerona players
Córdoba CF players
São Paulo FC players
Red Bull Bragantino players
CR Vasco da Gama players
La Liga players
Campeonato Brasileiro Série A players
Campeonato Brasileiro Série B players
Brazilian expatriate footballers
Brazilian expatriate sportspeople in Portugal
Expatriate footballers in Portugal
Brazilian expatriate sportspeople in Romania
Expatriate footballers in Romania
Brazilian expatriate sportspeople in Greece
Expatriate footballers in Greece
Brazilian expatriate sportspeople in Italy
Expatriate footballers in Italy
Brazilian expatriate sportspeople in Spain
Expatriate footballers in Spain